Ichocán is a town in the Ichocán District, San Marcos Province, Cajamarca region, Peru. It is the capital of Ichocán District.

Geography
The imposing hills called "The Church" and "The Bell" can  be seen when approaching this district. Ichocán was formerly known as Ichoca. Actress and artist Yma Sumac was born in Ichocán, according to some sources; other sources cite her place of birth as Callao.

Populated places in the Cajamarca Region